Charles Walter David Jr. (June 20, 1917 – March 29, 1943), who served as a Steward's Mate in the United States Coast Guard, died of pneumonia after rescuing other sailors from the frigid North Atlantic.
David volunteered to dive into the frigid waters to rescue exhausted crew and passengers from the Dorchester.  David also rescued several other Comanche crew members, who grew exhausted.

David came down with pneumonia after the exertion of the rescue, dying a few days later.  He was posthumously awarded the Navy and Marine Corps Medal.

David's widow Kathleen and young son Neil received the award on his behalf.

USCGC Charles David Jr

In 2010 when the Coast Guard decided that all the new Sentinel class cutters would be named after Coast Guard personnel who had been recognized for their heroism, David was one of those to be honored.
The seventh cutter in the class is named .  She is the first Sentinel class cutter to be homeported in Key West, Florida.

References

External links

1917 births
1943 deaths
United States Coast Guard non-commissioned officers
Deaths from pneumonia in New York (state)
United States Coast Guard personnel killed in World War II